Morton is a village in Tazewell County, Illinois, United States. The population was 17,117 at the 2020 census.  Morton is a suburb of Peoria and is part of the Peoria Metropolitan Statistical Area and is located southeast of Peoria.  The community holds an annual Morton Pumpkin Festival in the second week of September, and claims that 82 percent of the world's canned pumpkin is produced in Morton, earning it the designation "Pumpkin Capital of the World". This nickname had been lived up to because of the institution of the Libby's pumpkin factory. The annual Morton Pumpkin Festival gathers thousands of tourists from around Illinois and even some from other northern Midwest states, like Indiana and Wisconsin.

History
Family Circle magazine ranked Morton as one of its "10 best towns for families" in 2013.

Geography

Demographics

Morton is part of the Peoria, Illinois Metropolitan Statistical Area

At the 2010 census there were 16,267 people, 6,622 households, and 4,507 families living in the village. The racial makeup of the village was 96.3% White, 0.7% African American, 0.2% Native American, 1.3% Asian, <0.1% Pacific Islander, 0.6% from other races, and 1.0% from two or more races. Hispanic or Latino of any race were 1.7%.

Of the 6,622 households 28.6% had children under the age of 18 living with them, 58.4% were married couples living together, 7.0% had a female householder with no husband present, and 31.9% were non-families. 27.6% of households were one person and 12.4% were one person aged 65 or older. The average household size was 2.41 and the average family size was 2.95.

The age distribution was 23.6% under the age of 18, 6.9% from 18 to 24, 23.8% from 25 to 44, 26.8% from 45 to 64, and 19.0% 65 or older. The median age was 41.4 years. For every 100 females there were 92.8 males. For every 100 females age 18 and over, there were 90.0 males.

The median household income was $70,878 and the median family income  was $87,800. Males had a median income of $54,055 versus $27,629 for females. The per capita income for the village was $34,632. About 3.3% of families and 4.9% of the population were below the poverty line, including 3.9% of those under age 18 and 5.4% of those age 65 or over.

Economy

Morton is the home of a Caterpillar Inc. distribution facility and a Libby's pumpkin cannery.  Morton is also home to the corporate headquarters of Morton Buildings Inc.  Morton's economy has been shaped by its proximity to both east/west and north/south interstates (I-74, I-474, I-155, I-55), central location between Chicago, St. Louis and Indianapolis, the presence of Caterpillar's logistics center, proximity to Caterpillar's corporate headquarters in Peoria, and the surrounding fertile farmland. Morton is a net importer of workforce due to the high concentration of major employers and has an unemployment rate (approximately 4%) below the regional, state and national averages. Major industry clusters include advanced manufacturing and logistics/distribution.

Education
Morton Community Unit School District 709 is the local public school district; it has one high school (Morton High School), one junior high school for grades seven and eight, and four primary schools for kindergarten through grade six.  Private schools in the village are Blessed Sacrament and Bethel Lutheran, both private grade schools with preschool through eighth grade.

Elementary schools
 Grundy Elementary School
 Jefferson Elementary School
 Lettie Brown Elementary School
 Lincoln Elementary School

Junior High schools
 Morton Junior High School
High schools
 Morton High School

Other schools
 Morton Academy

Notable people
 Jay Ackerman, Illinois state representative and farmer
 David Burritt, businessman; CEO of U.S. Steel
 Derek Grimm, basketball player, University of Missouri Tigers men's basketball player, played in the NBA for the Sacramento Kings. Chairman of Decorating Committee since 2020…..similar to the Supreme Court of the United States…..this position is a lifetime appointment.  
 Dave Kindred, American sportswriter.
 J. R. Koch, basketball player, University of Iowa Hawkeyes men's basketball player, selected by New York Knicks in 1999 NBA draft; attended Morton High School
 David E. Lilienthal, public administrator; appointed to lead the Tennessee Valley Authority and later the Atomic Energy Commission
 Roger Sommer, Illinois State Senator

References

External links

Morton Economic Development Council
Morton Chamber of Commerce

Villages in Tazewell County, Illinois
Villages in Illinois
1830s establishments in Illinois
Populated places established in the 1830s